The Impossible is a 2012 English-language Spanish disaster drama film directed by J. A. Bayona and written by Sergio G. Sánchez. It is based on the experience of María Belón and her family in the 2004 Indian Ocean tsunami. It features an international cast including  Naomi Watts, Ewan McGregor and Tom Holland in his film debut.

The film received positive reviews from critics for its direction and its acting, especially for Watts who was nominated for the Academy Award for Best Actress, the Golden Globe Award for Best Actress – Motion Picture Drama, and a Screen Actors Guild Award for Outstanding Performance by a Female Actor in a Leading Role.

Plot
In 2004, Doctor Maria Bennett, her husband Henry, and their three sons Lucas, Simon and Thomas go on a Christmas holiday to Khao Lak, Thailand. Arriving on Christmas Eve, they settle in and begin to enjoy the brand new Orchid Beach Resort. Two days later on December 26, the massive Indian Ocean tsunami inundates the area.

Maria and Lucas eventually emerge from the swirling water and find each other, with Maria having sustained serious injuries to her leg and chest. They help a toddler, Daniel, from the debris and are soon found by locals who dress and transfer them to a hospital in the city of Takua Pa. Daniel is separated from them during the journey. At the hospital, Maria encourages Lucas to help others find their family members while she goes into surgery for her chest injuries.

Meanwhile, Henry and the two younger boys have also survived and are together. Henry leaves Simon and Thomas with another family who are then taken to the mountains for safety by local relief crews. Henry stays behind to search for Maria and Lucas in the rubble. While out looking, injured and alone, he is picked up by a passer-by and driven to a nearby bus station with other survivors. 

Communication facilities are scarce, but a European tourist named Karl, who has also been separated from his family, lends Henry his cell phone to contact his relatives in England. Henry promises Maria's father he will look everywhere for his family and that he will find them. Karl volunteers to accompany Henry to look for Maria and Lucas as well as his own family, who were at the beach when the tsunami hit.

While Maria is in surgery, her medical chart is mixed up with a patient named Muriel Barnes, who has died. Lucas returns to find his mother's bed empty and is then taken to a tent where children without families are kept safe. The mistake is discovered when Lucas cannot identify any of the dead woman's jewelry and he is subsequently reunited with his mother, who had been moved to a private room in the ICU. While he waits in the hospital, Lucas sees Daniel, who has been reunited with his father.

Henry and Karl search for their families in various places before they arrive at the hospital, where Henry is given five minutes to look. Karl gives him a piece of paper with the names of his family members. 

A vehicle carrying Simon and Thomas also stops outside the hospital, and the boys get off so Thomas can urinate. From a distance, Lucas recognizes his father, and while searching for him in the chaotic crowd outside, Lucas's brothers spot him and they reunite. Henry finds the three of them together. He learns that Maria is in the hospital, ready to undergo more surgery for her leg. 

As the anesthesia puts her to sleep, Maria experiences flashbacks of how she came to be injured and how she surfaced the water. While she is in surgery, Lucas tells Henry he has something really important to tell Maria.

The following day, the family boards an ambulance airplane to Singapore so Maria may receive further medical treatment. A representative from their insurance company, Zurich Insurance, assures them everything will be taken care of as Lucas sees countless people outside the hospital looking through patient lists. On the plane, Lucas tells his mother that Daniel is safe with his father. Maria cries and looks out the window at the chaos left behind as the plane takes off.

Cast

Naomi Watts as Maria, a doctor and the mother of the Bennett family
Ewan McGregor as Henry, the father of the Bennett family
Tom Holland as Lucas, the 12-year-old son
 Samuel Joslin as Thomas, the seven-and-a-half-year-old son
 Oaklee Pendergast as Simon, the five-year-old son
 Marta Etura as Simone
 Sönke Möhring as Karl, a German man trying to find his wife and daughter. He joins Henry to find their families.
 Geraldine Chaplin as the Old Woman
 Johan Sundberg as Daniel

Production
The film was a co-production of Spanish film companies Apaches Entertainment and Telecinco Cinema, and employed much of the crew from The Orphanage, including the director, writer, production manager, cinematographer, composer, and editor. Filmed between the Ciudad de la Luz studio in Alicante (Spain) and Thailand. Principal photography began 23 August 2010 in Alicante and continued in October in Thailand.

Director Juan Antonio Bayona decided not to specify the nationalities of the main characters in order to create a universal film in which nationalities were irrelevant to the plot.

The tsunami was recreated with a mixture of digital effects and real water surges filmed in slow motion created in a water tank in Spain using miniatures that were destroyed by a huge wave. Bayona committed to working with real water rather than a computer-generated wave because he wanted the story to be authentic. This meant Watts and Holland spent five weeks filming physically and psychologically demanding scenes in a massive water tank. Holland, aged 14 at the time of filming, later described it as a "scary environment ...You can imagine how tiring and brutal that was."

Release
Warner Bros. Pictures released the film in Spain on 11 October 2012. The United States distribution rights were pre-bought by Summit Entertainment. A teaser trailer was released on 26 December 2011. After a full-length English language trailer was released on 20 August 2012, a United States release date of 21 December 2012 was confirmed by Summit. It was released on 11 October 2012 in Spain and in Ireland and the United Kingdom on 1 January 2013. The film was released in the United States on 4 January 2013 and was made available by Summit Entertainment through a website streaming the film to members of SAG-AFTRA for consideration of the SAG awards.

It was released on DVD/Blu-ray in the United States and Canada on Tuesday, 19 March 2013, with a European release 13 May 2013.

Reception

Critical response

Review aggregation website Rotten Tomatoes gave the film an approval rating of 81% based on 203 reviews, with an average rating of 7.3/10. The site's critical consensus reads, "The screenplay isn't quite as powerful as the direction or the acting, but with such an astonishing real-life story at its center, The Impossible is never less than compelling." At Metacritic, which assigns a weighted mean rating to reviews, the film had an average score of 73 out of 100, based on 42 critics, indicating "generally favourable reviews."

Roger Ebert of the Chicago Sun-Times gave a perfect four-star rating, praising the performances of Watts and McGregor, and the direction of Bayona. He called it "one of the best films of the year".

Deborah Young of The Hollywood Reporter gave a very positive review, praising the performances of the two leading stars, stating that "Watts packs a huge charge of emotion as the battered, ever-weakening Maria whose tears of pain and fear never appear fake or idealised. McGregor, cut and streaked with excessive blood he seems too distraught to wash away, keeps the tension razor-sharp as he pursues his family in a vast, shattered landscape." About the film she added, "The Impossible is one of the most emotionally realistic disaster movies in recent memory – and certainly one of the most frightening in its epic re-creation of the catastrophic 2004 Indian Ocean tsunami."

Justin Chang of Variety magazine gave a positive review, praising Bayona's directing and Sánchez's writing: "Collaborating again after their impressive 2007 debut feature, The Orphanage, Bayona and Sanchez get many things right here, starting with their decision to eschew a more panoramic view of the disaster to follow one family's journey from start to finish." About the performances of the main cast members he added, "Watts has few equals at conveying physical and emotional extremes, something she again demonstrates in a mostly bedridden role, and McGregor, in one of his better recent performances, manages to turn a simple phone call home into a small aria of heartbreak. Holland, in his live-action bigscreen debut, is wonderful as a kind, somewhat short-tempered kid who still has plenty to learn, setting the tone for similarly heartrending turns by young Joslin and Pendergast."

Damon Wise of The Guardian gave the film four stars out of five. He also praised the performances, stating that "as Maria, Watts is both brave and vulnerable, and her scenes with the young Lucas (the excellent Tom Holland) are among the film's best, with adult and child now unexpected equals, the mother humbled, the son rising to the challenge. McGregor, meanwhile, gives one of his best performances as the sad and desperate Henry, trying to play the hero, the provider, while knowing his cause is almost certainly lost." About the film, he added: "Part of the appeal of this affecting and powerful drama is that it puts the viewer right in the moment at every stage, using authentic locations and tsunami survivors to hammer home the reality of this tragedy."

Eric Kohn of IndieWire gave the film a "B−" grade and stated that the film "suffers from the greater problem of emphasising a feel-good plot within the context of mass destruction."

According to The New York Times reviewer A. O. Scott, this narrowly-defined cinematic framing of the disaster through European and not Thai lenses represents "a troubling complacency and a lack of compassion in The Impossible," a movie which he found to be "less an examination of mass destruction than the tale of a spoiled holiday."

Response from victims
Simon Jenkins, a British survivor from Portsmouth, wrote to The Guardian, stating the film is "beautifully accurate". This was in response to critics commenting that the film is "overdramatic" and "whitewashed". He says of the comments, "As I must, I've never been the sort of person to revisit and analyse events of the past, but some of these articles frustrated me. Had this film been purely about the tale of a western middle class family's 'ruined' holiday then I would have agreed. For me, it was the exact opposite. Rather than concentrating on the 'privileged white visitors', the film portrayed the profound sense of community and unity that I experienced in Thailand, with this family at the centre of it. Both for my (then) 16-year-old self and the Belón family, it was the Thai people who waded through the settled water after the first wave had struck to help individuals and families... The Thai people had just lost everything – homes, businesses, families – yet their instinct was to help the tourists."

Box office
The Impossible was a box office success. In Spain the film was released on 11 October 2012, and opened in 638 cinemas, grossing $11,569,306 on its opening weekend, ranking No. 1 with a per-cinema average of $18,134, the highest-grossing opening weekend for a film in Spain. On its second weekend the film remained at No. 1 and grossed $9,016,065 with a per-cinema average of $14,022. On its third weekend it remained at No. 1 and made $5,768,184 with a per-cinema average of $9,098. The film ended up earning $54,536,668 at the Spanish box office and $180,274,123 worldwide, compared with its estimated $45 million production budget.

Accolades

See also 
 List of Spanish films of 2012
 Survival film about the film genre, with a list of related films

References

External links

 
 
 
 
 

2012 films
2010s disaster films
2012 drama films 
2010s survival films
Spanish disaster films
Spanish drama films
English-language Spanish films
2004 Indian Ocean earthquake and tsunami
Disaster films based on actual events
Drama films based on actual events
Films about death
Films about families
Films about tsunamis
Films about vacationing
Films set in 2004
Films set in Thailand
Films shot at Ciudad de la Luz
Films shot in Thailand
Telecinco Cinema films
Films directed by J. A. Bayona
Films scored by Fernando Velázquez
Warner Bros. films
Films produced by Álvaro Augustin
Films produced by Ghislain Barrois
Films produced by Javier Ugarte
Summit Entertainment films
Apache Films films
2010s English-language films
2010s Spanish films